Oedura luritja, also called the Mereenie velvet gecko, is a species of geckos endemic to the Northern Territory of Australia.

References

Oedura
Geckos of Australia
Reptiles described in 2016
Taxa named by Paul M. Oliver
Taxa named by Peter J. McDonald (herpetologist)